F Bar was a gay bar and nightclub in Midtown, Houston, in the U.S. state of Texas. The bar opened in 2011 and closed in 2017. Garth Mueller of Frommer's rated the bar 1 out of 3 stars.

F Bar had taken customers from the JR's Bar and Grill/South Beach Houston/Montrose Mining Company/Meteor bar family, and the latter business family banned employees who began working at F Bar from patronizing JR/South Beach/Meteor. After the JR's business family enacted a fee on the shuttle between Meteor and the other vars, F Bar began compensating for the shuttle fee.

References

External links

 
 F Bar at Houston Press
 F Bar at Lonely Planet
 F Bar at Zomato

2011 establishments in Texas
2017 disestablishments in Texas
Defunct LGBT nightclubs in Texas
Midtown, Houston